The following are a list of awards and nominations received by English actor Robert Pattinson. He received the Best Actor award at the Strasbourg Film Festival for his performance in How to Be. For his work on The Twilight Saga, he has earned two Empire Award nominations and won eleven MTV Movie Awards, two People's Choice Awards with additional other awards and nominations including winning 2009's Hollywood Film Award for New Hollywood by Hollywood Film Festival.

In 2014, he earned nominations from Australian Academy Awards (AACTA) and Canadian Screen Awards for his performances in The Rover and Maps to the Stars respectively. He won Hollywood Rising Star Award for his performance in Life from Deauville American Film Festival in 2015.

Major awards

AACTA Awards

Canadian Screen Awards

Empire Awards

Gotham Awards

Independent Spirit Awards

Critics' awards

Film Festival awards

Deauville American Film Festival

First Glance Film Festival
It is an annual film festival, located in Los Angeles and Philadelphia.

Hollywood Film Festival

Strasbourg Film Festival

Savannah Film Festival

Other Industry awards

CinEuphoria Awards

Golden Raspberry Awards

Scream Awards

Saturn Awards

Audience awards

BBC Radio 1 Teen Awards

Bravo Otto Awards

Empire Cinema Alternative Movie Awards

MTV Movie Awards

Nickelodeon Kids' Choice Awards

People's Choice Awards

Rembrandt Award

Richard Attenborough Film Awards

Russia's Georges Award

Teen Choice Awards

Virgin Media Awards

List of all awards by film

Notes
 Shared with Billy Burke, Justin Chon, Sarah Clarke, Peter Facinelli, Edi Gathegi, Cam Gigandet, Ashley Greene, Anna Kendrick, Taylor Lautner, Rachelle Lefèvre, Kellan Lutz, Jackson Rathbone, Elizabeth Reaser, Nikki Reed, Christian Serratos, Kristen Stewart and Michael Welch.

 Shared with Kristen Stewart.

 Shared with Cam Gigandet.

 Shared with Bryce Dallas Howard and Xavier Samuel.

 Shared with Taylor Lautner and Kristen Stewart.

 Shared with Cameron Bright, Billy Burke, Sarah Clarke, Bryce Dallas Howard, Peter Facinelli, Dakota Fanning, Jodelle Ferland, Ashley Greene, Anna Kendrick, Taylor Lautner, Kellan Lutz, Jackson Rathbone, Elizabeth Reaser, Nikki Reed, Xavier Samuel, Catalina Sandino Moreno, Kristen Stewart and Michael Welch.

 Shared with MyAnna Buring, Billy Burke, Christian Camargo, Jamie Campbell Bower, Sarah Clarke, Peter Facinelli, Olga Fonda, Mackenzie Foy, Maggie Grace, Ashley Greene, Christopher Heyerdahl, Julia Jones, Casey LaBow, Taylor Lautner, Kellan Lutz, Mía Maestro, Jackson Rathbone, Elizabeth Reaser, Nikki Reed, Michael Sheen, Chaske Spencer, Booboo Stewart and Kristen Stewart.

Shared with Zoë Kravitz.

References

External links
 

Pattinson, Robert